The Primera División de Fútbol Profesional Clausura 2009 season (officially known as "Torneo Clausura 2009"), started on January 31, 2009, and concluded on May 24, 2009.

A.D. Isidro Metapán the defending champions,  won their third league title winning the previous season as well. A total of 10 teams contested the league.

The 10 teams of the Primera División each played 18 matches, playing each team twice (home and away). The top four teams qualified directly to the semifinals.

A.D. Isidro Metapán gained entry into the 2009–10 CONCACAF Champions League winning the season as well as the previous one .

Team information

Personnel and sponsoring

League standings

Playoffs

*Note: C.D. Luis Ángel Firpo qualified to the finals due to higher league position.

Final

Since Isidro Metapán already qualified for 2009–10 CONCACAF Champions League, Luis Ángel Firpo also qualified (originally Apetura 2008 runner-up Chalatenango qualified, but they failed to file the required participation agreement).

Aggregate table

Top scorers

Attendance

Managerial changes

During the season

List of foreign players in the league
This is a list of foreign players in Clausura 2009. The following players:
have played at least one Clausura game for the respective club.
have not been capped for the El Salvador national football team on any level, independently from the birthplace

each club could have four players

C.D. Águila

  Arturo Albarrán
  Leandro Franco
  José Oliveira
  Marcelo Messias

Alianza F.C.
  Sebastián Viera
  Juliano de Andrade
  Sandro Zamboni
  Francisco Portillo
  Manuel Luna

Atlético Balboa
  Alcides Bandera
  Franklin Webster
  Elder Figueroa

C.D. FAS
  Roberto Peña
  Osvaldo Mendoza
  Jeyson Vega

C.D. Luis Ángel Firpo
  Pompilio Cacho
  Patricio Barroche
  Edgar Leguizamón
  Matias Fernández

A.D. Isidro Metapán
  Anel Canales
  Gabriel Garcete
  Ernesto Aquino
  Paolo Suárez

Nejapa F.C.
  Alejandro Bentos
  Luis Espindola
  Andrés Aguirre
  Juan Carlos Reyes

Juventud Independiente
  Paulinho
  Carlos Escalante
  Luis José Pérez
  Néstor Reyes

Vista Hermosa
  Nicolás Muñoz
  Luis Torres
  Luciano Harry
  Jean Franco Carreño

References

External links
Final's Report (Spanish) at El Grafico

Primera División de Fútbol Profesional Clausura seasons
El
1